John Trevor Holmes (born 16 November 1939) is a former English first-class cricketer. Born in Holmfirth, Yorkshire, he played as a right-handed batsman and wicket-keeper for Somerset.

Holmes made a single first-class appearance for the team, during the 1969 season, against the touring West Indians. Holmes scored a duck in the first innings in which he batted, and 8 runs in the second, as Somerset lost the match by a wide margin. According to one account, Holmes' selection for Somerset was "on the strength of a 2nd XI match at Pontypridd and typical surge of enthusiasm from the current coach, Bill Andrews".

References

External links
Trevor Holmes at Cricket Archive

1939 births
English cricketers
Somerset cricketers